The American Board of Plastic Surgery, Inc. was organized as a subsidiary of the American Board of Surgery in 1938. The American Board of Plastic Surgery, Inc. was given the status of a major specialty board in 1941. It is the one certifying body for Plastic and Reconstructive surgery recognised by the American Board of Medical Specialties.

Overview
ABPS certification has the following requirements:
Graduation from an accredited medical school
Completion of either:
at least three years of general surgery residency training
or a complete residency in neurological surgery, orthopaedic surgery, otolaryngology, oral and maxillofacial surgery, or urology.
Completion of plastic surgery residency training of at least two years
Passing comprehensive oral and written exams

Renewal of certification: Diplomates who received ABPS certification in 1995 or after must be renewed by  Maintenance of Certification (MOC) examination every 10 years. Diplomates who were Board Certified prior to 1995] are not required to renew by examination every 10 years. Board Certification certificates issued prior to 1995 have no expiration date.

References

External links
 

Surgical organizations based in the United States
Plastic surgery organizations
Medical and health organizations based in Pennsylvania
Organizations established in 1938